Central Australia is a region in the Northern Territory of Australia

Central Australia  may also refer to.

Central Australia (territory), a former Australian internal territory
Central Australia Railway, a former railway
Supreme Court of Central Australia, a former superior court

See also
Central Australian Aviation Museum
Central Australian Aboriginal Media Association
Central Australian Football League